TOK Coachlines (formerly Can-ar Coach Service) is a scheduled and chartered coach operator in the Greater Toronto Area, It is a division of Tokmakjian Inc., a privately held Canadian corporation operating as TOK Group based in Vaughan, Ontario. A related division of TOK Group is TOK Transit which operates public transit services under contract to municipalities.

History
Can-ar Coach was established in 1983 when Travelways Incorporated, a Thornhill-based bus operator founded in 1976, was sold by Larry Needler (co-owner with several other partners).

Both TOK Coachlines and TOK Transit originally operated as Can-ar Coach Service.

Operations
TOK Coachlines operates two scheduled daily bus routes to Union Station, Toronto from Haliburton via Lindsay and from Port Elgin via Toronto Pearson International Airport. It also operates a service between Fort Erie and Crystal Beach on behalf of Fort Erie Transit.

TOK Transit operates public transit bus service under contract for York Region Transit,  and for Fort Erie Transit.

Fleet

Can-ar
In 2012, Can-ar operated approximately 40 buses. The fleet information is based on the information its former website.

This list of retired Can-ar buses may not be complete. It is based on information from 2004.

Can-ar used to operate a fleet of over 75 transit buses, owned by York Region Transit, under an extension of the contract under which it operated Vaughan Transit for the City of Vaughan.

See also
 Bus companies in Ontario

References

External links
 TOK Group
 TOK Coachlines on  site

Bus transport in Ontario
Intercity bus companies of Canada
Transport in the Greater Toronto Area
Canadian companies established in 1983
Transport companies established in 1983